Troops of Tomorrow is the second album by Scottish punk rock band The Exploited, released in 1982 through Secret Records.

Music video for "U.S.A."
The video for the song "U.S.A." starts off with an intro saying "And so... a Pandora's box of rejection and reaction was opened. Today, thousands carry on the greatest anti-movement of our age. Punk rock, the end of our dreams..." (UK/DK: A Film About Punks and Skinheads, 1983). After the intro, the band performs on a stage with Gary McCormack playing the bass guitar, Big John Duncan playing the electric guitar and Danny Heatley playing the drums. There are also occasionally clips of the band walking down the street in Scotland and are having a little fun before they walk in a building, possibly the building in which they are shown performing. A brief interview begins after the song, in which Wattie explains his views on why punk music was still flourishing (where he tells the interviewer "it never died!") and how the band struggled with their previous image as a fascist band as they used to wear Swastika armbands.

The use of the swastika was common in the late 70s as punks wanted to shock the older generation.

Track listing
All songs written by Wattie Buchan and Big John Duncan, except where noted.

Side one
 "Jimmy Boyle" – 2:07
 "Daily News" – 2:57
 "Disorder" – 2:18
 "Alternative" (Buchan, Campbell, Duncan, Gary McCormack) – 2:04
 "U.S.A." (Buchan, Duncan, McCormack) – 3:19
 "Rapist" (Buchan, Campbell, Duncan, McCormack) – 1:27
 "Troops of Tomorrow" (The Vibrators cover) – 4:54
Side two
 "UK 82" – 2:47
 "Sid Vicious Was Innocent" (Buchan, McCormack) – 2:57
 "War" (Buchan, McCormack) – 3:47
 "They Won't Stop" (Buchan, McCormack) – 2:18
 "So Tragic" (Buchan, McCormack) – 1:48
 "Germs" (Buchan, Duncan, McCormack) – 4:38
2001 reissue CD bonus tracks
 "Attack" – 2:26
 "Alternative" (single version) – 1:59
 "Y.O.P." – 1:43
 "Troops of Tomorrow" (The Vibrators cover) (12" version) – 3:10
 "Computers Don't Blunder" – 2:33
 "Addiction" – 1:40

Critical reception

AllMusic called the album a classic of the hardcore punk genre and a landmark British punk rock album.

Legacy
The album's sound influenced bands such as Agnostic Front and Stormtroopers of Death.

A medley of "War", "Disorder" and "UK 82", covered by Slayer and Ice-T is featured in the soundtrack for the 1993 film Judgement Night.

The chorus of "UK 82" was changed to "LA 92" to reflect the 1992 Los Angeles riots.

"UK 82" was also used as the opening and closing track to the 1983 film Made in Britain, starring Tim Roth.

In 2020, Mr. Bungle recorded a cover of "U.S.A." (which they titled simply "USA"). The track was the first time the band had recorded music since the 1999 album California.

Personnel 
The Exploited
Wattie Buchan – vocals
Big John Duncan – guitar
Gary "Beaker" McCormack – bass
Danny Heatley – drums

Production
Ian "Buck" Murdock and Glenn Kingsmore (Defects) – backing vocals on "Germs"
Ian Carnochan – composer
Karyn Dunning – liner notes
Mez Meredith and Scott Billett – photography
Terry Oakes – illustrations
Steve Roberts – drums (on all tracks except "Sid Vicious Was Innocent" and "Germs")
Tim Turan – mastering
Tim Smith – design
Tony Spath – production and engineering

References

1982 albums
The Exploited albums
Secret Records albums